Hsiao Chia-chi (born 21 June 1961) is a Taiwanese politician. He was the Deputy Secretary-General of the Executive Yuan in 2014 and previously served in the Interior Ministry.

Interior Deputy Ministry

Migration to Northern Taiwan
In January 2014, commenting on the recent trend of massive migration of people from Southern to Northern Taiwan over the past six years, Hsiao said that measures will be taken to improve the infrastructure and social welfare, as well as to help young people in the less developed areas. Urban planning will also be reviewed in populated city areas.

Executive Yuan Deputy Secretary-General

Sunflower Student Movement
In the aftermath of the students occupation of the Executive Yuan in March 2014 during the damage inspection of the Yuan accompanied by Secretary-General Lee Shu-chuan, Hsiao gave a statement which drew criticism from the public for giving more concern of his stolen suncake than the well-being of the wounded protesters. The offended public reacted by giving him back 150 boxes of suncake the next day. Hsiao however did not accept them, noting that in a democratic society it is acceptable for people to voice our their opinion but not to take other people's belonging.

References

1961 births
Living people
Government ministers of Taiwan
Deputy mayors of Taichung